Hawthorne of the U.S.A. is a 1919 American silent comedy adventure film directed by James Cruze and starring Wallace Reid and Lila Lee. The film is based on the play of the same name by James B. Fagan. It had run on Broadway in 1912 with Douglas Fairbanks in the title role. The scenario for the film was written by Walter Woods. The film was produced by Famous Players-Lasky, and distributed by Famous Players under the Paramount-Artcraft Picture banner.

A print of Hawthorne of the U.S.A. is preserved at the Library of Congress.

Plot
As described in a film magazine, Anthony Hawthorne (Reid), an American with modern ideas, stirs fashionable Europe when he breads the bank at Monte Carlo. Prince Vladimir (Stevens), a covetous member of the royal family of a small principality, makes an attempt to obtain the fund Hawthorne has on in order to purchase the army of Augustus III (Brower), whom he seeks to depose. Hawthorne joins the prince in his plot but changes his mind when he meets Princess Irma (Lee) and learns that the prince plans to murder her father. Hawthorne works to foil the plot of the prince and ends up establishing a republican form of government and marrying Irma.

Cast
Wallace Reid as Anthony Hamilton Hawthorne
Lila Lee as Princess Irma
Harrison Ford as Rodney Blake
Tully Marshall as Nitchi
Charles Ogle as Colonel Radulski
Guy Oliver as Count Henloe
Edwin Stevens as Prince Vladimir
Clarence Burton as Fredericks
Theodore Roberts as Senator Ballard
Ruth Renick as Kate Ballard
Robert Brower as King Augustus III
Frank Bonner as De Witz

See also
Wallace Reid filmography

References

External links

 
 

1919 films
1910s adventure comedy films
American adventure comedy films
American silent feature films
American black-and-white films
Famous Players-Lasky films
American films based on plays
Films directed by James Cruze
Paramount Pictures films
1919 comedy films
1910s American films
Silent American comedy films
Silent adventure films
1910s English-language films